The list of ship launches in 1990 includes a chronological list of all ships launched in 1990.

References

1990
Ship launches